Turkish delight is a family of confections based on a gel of starch and sugar.

Turkish delight or Turkish Delight may also refer to:

Entertainment
 Turkish Delight (1927 film)
 A chapter in the book The Lion, The Witch, and The Wardrobe by C. S. Lewis
 Turkish Delight (1973 film), a 1973 Dutch film directed by Paul Verhoeven
 Turks Fruit (novel), by Jan Wolkers, on which the film is based
 Turkish Delight, a 1973 television drama written by Caryl Churchill

Food
 Fry's Turkish Delight, a chocolate sweet made by Cadbury
 A beverage made from salep orchid tuber flour, popular mainly in Turkey

Nicknames
 Despina Storch (1895–1918), a Turkish spy in World War I
 Turhan Bey (1922–2012), an Austrian actor